Mainstay Lake is a lake in the Pomeroon-Supenaam Region of Guyana, near the Atlantic coast, northwest of the mouth of the Essequibo River,  north of Adventure. There is a  stretch of white sand at the edge of the lake.

Economic activity 
A resort has been built next to the lake, a seven miles from the region’s administrative hub at Anna Regina, or through the resort on a twenty-minute flight from Georgetown to the resort’s airstrip. Mainstay Lake Resort hosts an annual regatta as well as a regular Easter Car and Bike Show. The resort was closed for seven months in 2020 due to the COVID-19 pandemic.

A pineapple processing facility was established in Mainstay/Whyaka in 2002, an initiative of the National Agricultural Research Institute (NARI) and Amazon Caribbean Ltd (AMCAR). Due to declining pineapple farming in the area, AMCAR closed the facility in 2014; there were talks of reopening in 2019.

Settlement 

Whyaka or Whyak is a thirteen square-mile Amerindian community of mostly Arawak people. Arawaks were the first to inhabit the Mainstay area who called it ‘Quacabuka’ meaning ‘in-between'. The village has a population of 576 and features a primary school (once known as St. Vincent Anglican School) and a nursery school, a health centre, a community centre, a ballfield, a chicken farm, a pine factory, a heritage park. Secondary schooling is done in Anna Regina or Cotton Field. The toshao is Milton Fredericks.

References 

Tourist attractions in Guyana
Lakes of Guyana